Lohna is a village situated in Jhanjharpur Block of Madhubani District in the Indian state of  Bihar. It is well connected by road and railways. The nearest railway station is Lohna Road Station which is at distance of around 2 km from the village. Total area of the village is 2200 Bigha (About 880 Lac sq Feet). The river Lakshmana (Lakhandey) divides the village in two equal parts. The name Lohna came from Lohini Bhagwati which was on the bank of the river Lakshmana. 

A description about the village is given in "SKAND PURAN". A Sanskrit Mahavidyalay (College) is also in the village, which is about to take its last breath. 60/70 years before it was a popular Sanskrit Mahavidyalay, 400 to 500 students were studying there. The diminished building is yet evidencing it. A temple named BIDESHWAR ASTHAN is also here. Here temple of Shiv and Parwati are situated. Gramay Devata named Maksudan Baba is near Bideshwar Asthan. People come here to Worship after Mundan and Upanayana of their sons.

Now the village is well connected by NH HIGHWAY 57 which was completed in 2010. Nearest Railway Station is Lohna Road Station.

Legendary poet Mahakavi Umapati (author of Rukmini Swember) was born in Lohna.

Postal Pin Code for Lohna(West) and Lohna(East) are 847424 & 847407 respectively.

References
 

Villages in Madhubani district